The Association for Computational Linguistics (ACL) is a scientific and professional organization for people working on natural language processing. Its namesake conference is one of the primary high impact conferences for natural language processing research, along with EMNLP. The conference is held each summer in locations where significant computational linguistics research is carried out.

It was founded in 1962, originally named the Association for Machine Translation and Computational Linguistics (AMTCL). It became the ACL in 1968. The ACL has a European (EACL), a North American (NAACL), and an Asian (AACL) chapter.

History
The ACL was founded in 1962 as the Association for Machine Translation and Computational Linguistics (AMTCL). The initial membership was about 100. In 1965 the AMTCL took over the journal Mechanical Translation and Computational Linguistics. This journal was succeeded by many other journals: American Journal of Computational Linguistics (1974—1978, 1980—1983), and then Computational Linguistics (1984—present). Since 1988, the journal has been published for the ACL by MIT Press.

The annual meeting was first held in 1963 in conjunction with the Association for Computing Machinery National Conference. The annual meeting was, for much time, relatively informal and did not publish anything lengthier than abstracts. By 1968, the society took on its current name, the Association for Computational Linguistics (ACL). The publishing of the annual meeting's Proceedings of the ACL began in 1979, and gradually matured into its modern form. Many of the meetings were held in conjunction with the Linguistic Society of America, and a few with the American Society for Information Science and Cognitive Science Society.

The United States government sponsored much research from 1989 to 1994, leading to a maturing of the ACL, characterized by an increase in author retention rates and an increase in research in some key topics, such as speech recognition. By the 21st century, the society was able to maintain authors at a high rate who coalesced in a more stable arrangement around individual research topics.

In 2020, the annual meeting of the ACL for the first time received more submissions from China than from the United States, reflecting the increasing geographical diversity of the society.

Conference Locations
  ACL 2023, Toronto, Canada
  ACL 2022, Dublin, Ireland
  ACL 2021, Bangkok, Thailand (moved online due to COVID-19)
  ACL 2020, originally Seattle, Washington, United States (moved online due to COVID-19)
  ACL 2019, Florence, Italy
  ACL 2018, Melbourne, Australia
  ACL 2017, Vancouver, Canada

Ref

Activities
The ACL organizes several of the top conferences and workshops in the field of computational linguistics and natural language processing. These include:
 Annual Meeting of the Association for Computational Linguistics (ACL), the flagship conference of the organization
 Empirical Methods in Natural Language Processing (EMNLP)
 International Joint Conference on Natural Language Processing (IJCNLP), held jointly one of the other conferences on a rotating basis
 Conference on Computational Natural Language Learning (CoNLL)
 Lexical and Computational Semantics and Semantic Evaluation (SemEval)
 Joint Conference on Lexical and Computational Semantics (*SEM)
 Workshop on Statistical Machine Translation (WMT)

Besides conferences, the ACL also sponsors the journals Computational Linguistics and Transactions of the Association for Computational Linguistics (TACL). Papers and other presentations at ACL and ACL-affiliated venues are archived online in the open-access ACL Anthology.

Special Interest Groups
ACL has a large number of Special Interest Groups (SIGs), focusing on specific areas of natural language processing. Some current SIGs within ACL are:

Presidents

Each year the ACL elects a distinguished computational linguist who becomes vice-president of the organization in the next calendar year and president one year later. Recent ACL presidents are:

References

External links  
 
 ACL Anthology
 ACL Wiki
 EACL
 NAACL
 AACL

Computational linguistics
International professional associations
Organizations established in 1962
Computer science-related professional associations